Cloister is a serif typeface that was designed by Morris Fuller Benton and published by American Type Founders from around 1913. It is loosely based on the printing of Nicolas Jenson in Venice in the 1470s, in what is now called the "old style" of serif fonts. American Type Founders presented it as an attractive but highly usable serif typeface, suitable both for body text and display use.

Metal type release
To ensure its versatility, Cloister was released in a wide selection of sizes and weights. This included an italic (ATF's design, as italics did not exist in Jenson's time) with swash capitals, an inline style and Cloister Initials, a set of initial capitals by Frederic Goudy to match. The practice of creating a wide range of variants of a successful face was a standard ATF practice in order to capitalise on a successful typeface's popularity and allow coherent layout and graphic design; its 1923 specimen book described its approach of creating families which could allow types to "talk at command with varying emphasis and orchestral power...the client [has] perceived that a catalogue or advertisement set in one type family had more influence...than if its message to the public were confused by a medley of display types."

Unlike many other American Type Founders typefaces, Cloister was cast on the "art line" rather than the standardised "common line" of American metal type used in the period. This meant that it was cast with the area of the typeface above the baseline smaller than normal, so the descenders could be at a long, historically accurate length. ATF released a blackletter design under the name of "Cloister Black"; this and a set of Cloister Borders were the first ATF typefaces to use the name, before Cloister Old Style was released. Later Cloister was released on hot metal typesetting machines such as that of Linotype, Intertype and Monotype, and additional weights were created for these.

Cloister was somewhat variably named by printers in the metal type period, with "Cloister Old Style", "Cloister Oldstyle", "Cloister Old Face" and "Cloister Oldface" all used to refer to it.

Cloister's release in metal type included the following:
 Cloister Old Style roman
 Cloister Italic
 Cloister Cursive (swash alternates for the italic)
 Cloister Bold
 Cloister Bold Italic
 Cloister Title (titling capitals, talking up the whole surface area of the metal type with no space for descenders)
 Cloister Bold Title
 Cloister Bold Condensed
 Cloister Lightface (a lighter style)
 Cloister Lightface Italic
 Cloister Cursive Handtooled

Digitisations

A digitisation has been released by P22 and another by URW. Goudy's Cloister Initials, much esteemed in their own right, have also been digitised by P22 and by Dieter Steffmann. Cloister Black has also been digitised separately.

See also
 Centaur
 Golden Type
 Hightower Text

References

External links
 ATF's 1923 specimen book (their legendary last major specimen before the Depression), showing Cloister on pp. 66–81 (original page numbers).
 Specimen sheet (Intertype specimen)
 ATF 1912 specimen book - shows Cloister Black (pages 810-811) and Cloister Borders (page 1038)

Letterpress typefaces
Old style serif typefaces
Typefaces designed by Morris Fuller Benton
American Type Founders typefaces